Pargat Singh (born 13 April 1992) is an Indian cricketer who plays for Canada. He made his first-class debut on 22 October 2015 in the 2015–16 Ranji Trophy. He made his List A debut on 10 December 2015 in the 2015–16 Vijay Hazare Trophy. He made his Twenty20 debut on 2 January 2016 in the 2015–16 Syed Mushtaq Ali Trophy.

In November 2022, he was named in Canada's T20I squad for the 2022 Desert Cup T20I Series. He made his T20I debut on 14 November 2022, against Bahrain.

References

External links
 

1992 births
Living people
Indian cricketers
Canadian cricketers
Canada Twenty20 International cricketers
Punjab, India cricketers
People from Rupnagar